Speaker of the Legislative Assembly is a title commonly held by presiding officers of parliamentary bodies styled legislative assemblies. The office is most widely used in state and territorial legislatures in Australia, and in provincial and territorial legislatures in Canada.

Examples follow.

Australia 

Speaker of the Australian Capital Territory Legislative Assembly
Speaker of the New South Wales Legislative Assembly
Speaker of the Northern Territory Legislative Assembly
Speaker of the Legislative Assembly of Queensland
Speaker of the Victorian Legislative Assembly
Speaker of the Western Australian Legislative Assembly

Canada 

Speaker of the Legislative Assembly of Alberta
Speaker of the Legislative Assembly of British Columbia
Speaker of the Legislative Assembly of Manitoba
Speaker of the Legislative Assembly of Northwest Territories
Speaker of the Legislative Assembly of Nunavut
Speaker of the Legislative Assembly of Ontario
Speaker of the Legislative Assembly of Prince Edward Island
Speaker of the Legislative Assembly of Saskatchewan
Speaker of the Legislative Assembly of New Brunswick
Speaker of the Yukon Legislative Assembly

Falkland Islands 

Speaker of the Legislative Assembly of the Falkland Islands

India 

See Speaker of the Legislative Assembly (India)

See also 

President of the Legislative Assembly (disambiguation)
Speaker of the House of Assembly (disambiguation)
President of the National Assembly of Quebec